Sineu is a municipality in central Mallorca, one of the Balearic Islands, Spain. Olympic cyclist Francisco Tortellá was born here.

References

Municipalities in Mallorca
Populated places in Mallorca